Alejandro Arturo García Ruíz (born February 21, 1992, in Hermosillo, Sonora) is a Mexican former professional footballer.

External links

1992 births
Living people
Sportspeople from Hermosillo
Footballers from Sonora
Association footballers not categorized by position
Mexican footballers
C.F. Monterrey players
Correcaminos UAT footballers
Potros UAEM footballers
FC Juárez footballers
Ascenso MX players
21st-century Mexican people